The Ballarat Imperial Football Club was an Australian rules football club which formerly competed in the Ballarat Football League. The club was one of the most successful teams in the league, winning 17 premierships before it was dissolved in 1955.

History 

The club was formed in the mid-1870s as the "Galatea Football Club" before becoming known as "Ballarat Imperial" in 1878. The club was a provincial member of the Victorian Football Association (VFA) from 1885 until 1896, taking part in the Association's administration and competing regularly against Melbourne-based VFA clubs.

Ballarat Imperial was a founding member of the Ballarat Football Association in 1893, and was its dominant club through its early years, winning eleven of the first fourteen premierships. The club returned to prominence in the 1930s, winning four premierships in a row from 1934–1937. In 1937, it made an attempt to rejoin the VFA as a full member. However, it was felt that a second Ballarat-based team would have to be included to ensure that one VFA game could be played in Ballarat each weekend, and no willing co-applicant could be found.

The club went into recess during World War II and, although it played B-Grade football for a period of time after the war, it never returned to the top grade.

Premierships 
 Ballarat Football League (17): 1893, 1894, 1895, 1896, 1899, 1900, 1901, 1902, 1903, 1905, 1906, 1922, 1929, 1934, 1935, 1936, 1937

References

Ballarat Football League clubs
Former Victorian Football League clubs
Ballarat
1876 establishments in Australia
Australian rules football clubs established in 1876
1955 disestablishments in Australia
Australian rules football clubs disestablished in 1955